Harlan Fengler (March 1, 1903 in Chicago, Illinois – March 26, 1981 in New Lebanon, Ohio) was an American racecar driver. Fengler acted as Chief Steward of the Indianapolis Motor Speedway from 1958 until 1974 and lived in New Lebanon, Ohio.

Indianapolis 500 results

References

Indianapolis 500 drivers
1903 births
1981 deaths
Racing drivers from Chicago
AAA Championship Car drivers
People from Montgomery County, Ohio